Sarah Payne may refer to:

 Murder of Sarah Payne (1991–2000), high-profile child murder victim in the UK
 Sarah Payne (actress), British actress
 Sarah Payne (prison governor), British director of NOMS Wales

See also
 Sara Payne (born 1969), mother of murder victim Sarah Payne
 Sarah C. Paine, professor of strategy and policy